Lama Mocogno is a comune (municipality) in the Province of Modena in the Italian region Emilia-Romagna, located about  southwest of Bologna and about  southwest of Modena. The Monte Cimone is located nearby.

Lama Mocogno borders the following municipalities: Montecreto, Palagano, Pavullo nel Frignano, Polinago, Riolunato.

References

External links
 Official website

Cities and towns in Emilia-Romagna